Luis Omedes (12 January 1938 – 18 July 2022) was a Spanish sportsman. He competed in the men's coxed four event in the rowing at the 1952 Summer Olympics. He also competed in the men's singles in the luge at the 1968 Winter Olympics.

See also
 List of athletes who competed in both the Summer and Winter Olympic games

References

External links
  

1938 births
2022 deaths
Spanish male rowers
Spanish male lugers
Olympic rowers of Spain
Olympic lugers of Spain
Rowers at the 1952 Summer Olympics
Lugers at the 1968 Winter Olympics
Rowers from the Basque Country (autonomous community)
Sportspeople from San Sebastián